This is a list of islands of Poland (Polish: Wyspy).

Baltic Sea

The following Polish islands are in the Baltic Sea:
 Usedom, 
 Wolin, 
 Wolińska Kępa,

Oder Lagoon

The following Polish islands are in the Oder Lagoon:
 Chełminek, 
 Chrząszczewska Island, 
 Gęsia Kępa, 
 Karsibór, 
 Koński Smug, 
 Trzcinice
 Warnie Kępy, 
 Wielki Krzek, 
 Wiszowa Kępa, 
 Wydrza Kępa,

Other Oder islands 
Islands of Wrocław
Tamka, 
Slodowa Island (Wyspa Słodowa), 
Wyspa Bielarska, 
Mill Island (Wyspa Młyńska), 
Wyspa Daliowa, 
Wyspa Piasek,

Islands of Gdańsk Bay and Vistula Lagoon

The following Polish islands are in the Gdańsk Bay and Vistula Lagoon:
 Aestian Island (artificial island in the Vistula Lagoon), approximately 
 Islands of Gdańsk
 Port Island Area: 25.7 km² population 22,167 people, 
 Sobieszewo Island Area: 34.3 km² population: 3,570 people, 
 Ostrów Island (Holm Island), 
 Granary Island (Wyspa Spichrzów), 
 Granary Island (Wyspa Spichrzów) in Elbląg,

Other
 (uninhabited island on the Oder River in Szczecin),  
, 
Upałty, 
Wielka Żuława (on Lake Jeziorak),

See also

 List of rivers of Poland
 List of islands in the Baltic Sea
 List of islands
 :pl:Lista wysp Polski

References 

Poland, List of islands of

Islands